Plagiosarus is a genus of beetles in the family Cerambycidae, containing the following species:

 Plagiosarus binoculus Bates, 1880
 Plagiosarus literatus Bates, 1885
 Plagiosarus melampus Bates, 1885

References

Acanthoderini